Bitch I'm the Shit 2 (stylized as BitchImTheShit2) is the fifth studio album by American rapper Tyga. It was released on July 21, 2017 by Last Kings Records and Empire Distribution. It is the sequel to his 2011 mixtape, #BitchImTheShit. The album features guest appearances Young Thug, Quavo, Chief Keef, Vince Staples, Ty Dolla $ign, A.E., and Honey Cocaine, and current G.O.O.D. Music label heads Kanye West and Pusha T.

Singles
On January 4, 2016, "Gone Too Far" was released. 
On June 17, 2016, "1 of 1" was released. 
On January 1, 2017, "Feel Me" featuring Kanye West was released. 
On April 4, 2017, "100's" featuring Chief Keef and A.E. was released. 
On May 5, 2017, "Eyes Closed" was released.
On June 2, 2017, "Playboy" featuring Vince Staples was released. 
On June 23, 2017, "Flossin" featuring his son, King was released. 
On July 7, 2017, "Move to L.A" featuring Ty Dolla Sign was released along with the pre-order of the album.

Track listing

Notes
 "Cash Splash NASA" is not available on streaming services.
 Originally, "Chandeliers" had background vocals by Travis Scott but were removed later that year.

Sample credits
 "Move to L.A." contains a sample of "What You Want" by Mase and Total
 "1 of 1" contains a sample of "Controlla" by Drake and "Sucky Ducky" by Mr. Vegas
 "Nann Nigga" contains a sample of "Nann Nigga" by Trick Daddy and Trina

Charts

References 

2017 mixtape albums
Empire Distribution albums
West Coast hip hop albums